Franklin Miller Garrett (September 25, 1906 – March 5, 2000) was the only official historian of Atlanta. His massive Atlanta and Environs: A Chronicle of its People and Events is a book about the city's history.

Biography
A native of Milwaukee, he moved to Atlanta in 1914.  He graduated from Technological High School in Atlanta, Georgia. He joined the Atlanta Historical Society in 1927 (a year after it was founded) which is today known as the Atlanta History Center. He served as historian for the Coca-Cola Company for 28 years. After retirement he devoted his full-time efforts to the Atlanta History Center.

He was married to Frances Steele Garrett, who died in September 2005.

Awards
 Named "official historian" of the city by Atlanta City Council, 1974
 Honorary doctorate from Oglethorpe University
 Honorary doctorate from Georgia State University on June 20, 1998
 Shining Light award for community service
 The Georgia Railroad Named EMD GP 38-2 locomotive number 6051, as The Franklin M. Garrett in 1980. This locomotive ran on the Georgia R.R. until 1983, when the Georgia was Merged into Seaboard System. Seaboard System kept the name on the locomotive. The 6051 pulled the Last Georgia Mixed Train out of Atlanta in 1983. This locomotive today is CSXT 2702, retaining the name, and was to assigned to Atlanta's Tilford Yard. However Tilford was torn out completely in 2018 and the 2702 is currently assigned to Hamlet, North Carolina, the former Seaboard Air Line hump yard and is used on Hamlet-Raleigh, NC and Hamlet-Columbia, SC local trains.

Books
 (First published in 1954, later expanded to 3 volumes by Garrett and a fourth by another author)

References

Further reading

External links

Grave stone picture from Oakland Cemetery in Atlanta.
Surname and landmark list from index to "Atlanta & Environs - Volumes 1 & 2" written by Franklin Garrett.

1906 births
2000 deaths
Burials at Oakland Cemetery (Atlanta)
Historians of Georgia (U.S. state)
Writers from Atlanta
20th-century American historians
American male non-fiction writers
20th-century American male writers
Historians from Georgia (U.S. state)